Ricky Gervais Live 2: Politics is the title of a stand-up comedy performance by British comedian Ricky Gervais. It was filmed at the Palace Theatre, London, United Kingdom in 2004.

External links
 

2004 films
2004 comedy films
British comedy films
Stand-up comedy concert films
Stand-up comedy on DVD
Ricky Gervais
2000s British films